Middleditch and Schwartz is an American improvisational comedy streaming television series created by and starring Thomas Middleditch and Ben Schwartz. The series of three hour-long performances was filmed at New York University's Skirball Center for the Performing Arts, and premiered on Netflix on April 21, 2020.

Premise 
Each hour-long episode is based on a random audience suggestion and is entirely improvised by performers Thomas Middleditch and Ben Schwartz.

Episodes

Reception 
The series was met with critical acclaim, receiving an approval rating of 100% on Rotten Tomatoes based on 13 reviews, with an average rating of 8.8/10. The website's critic consensus calls it a "brilliant series of specials sure to spark all kinds of joy" and "a masterclass in improv comedy." On Metacritic, the show has a score of 86 out of 100 based on four reviews, indicating "universal acclaim".

Jesse David Fox, writing for Vulture, commented that the series "could have significant ramifications on improv’s position in our culture" by opening the door for other comedians to practice improv professionally rather than in an amateur capacity.

References

External links 
 Middleditch and Schwartz on Netflix
 

English-language Netflix original programming
Improvisational television series
2020 American television series debuts
2020 American television seasons